Bernat Erta Majo (born 15 February 2001 in Lleida, Spain) is a Spanish sprinter specialising in the 400 and 400 metres hurdles. He was part of the relay that holds the national record in the 4 x 400 m indoor.

International competitions

References

External links
 
 
 
 

2001 births
Living people
Spanish male sprinters
Sportspeople from Lleida
Athletes from Catalonia
Athletes (track and field) at the 2018 Summer Youth Olympics
Athletes (track and field) at the 2020 Summer Olympics
Olympic athletes of Spain